The Yanzi River or Creek (Chinese: , Yànzǐhé, lit. "Swallow Creek") is a river in Gansu, China. It is a tributary of the Xihan, itself a part of the Yangtze watershed.

Rivers of Gansu
Yangtze River